Aleksei Tammiste (born July 29, 1946) is a retired Estonian professional basketball player, who competed for the Soviet Union. He won a gold medal at the 1971 EuroBasket Championship held in West Germany. During his career Tammiste won 10 Estonian league titles, the most domestic titles won by and Estonian basketball player. Elected to the Hall of fame of Estonian basketball in 2010.

Achievements

National Team
 European Championship:  1971

Club
 Estonian SSR Championship: 1967, 1968, 1969, 1970, 1972, 1973, 1975, 1976, 1977, 1979

References

Further reading

External links
Aleksei Tammiste 

1946 births
Living people
Sportspeople from Tartu
FIBA EuroBasket-winning players
Soviet men's basketball players
Estonian men's basketball players
Korvpalli Meistriliiga players
Tartu Ülikool/Rock players
KK Kalev players